Llácer or Llacer may refer to:

Àngel Llàcer (born 1974), Spanish actor, television presenter and drama teacher
Francis Llacer (born 1971), French former professional footballer
Hector Cabrera Llacer (born 1994), Spanish Paralympic athlete (javelin, shot put, discus)
José Pérez Llácer (1927–2006), Spanish racing cyclist
Roel Caboverde Llacer (born 1947), Cuban painter
Francisco Llácer Pla (1918–2002), Spanish composer and choral conductor
Enrique Llácer Soler (Alcoy, 20 June 1934), Spanish jazz and classical percussionist and composer